Luiz Henrique Pachu Lira (born 26 February 1996), commonly known as Pachu, is a Brazilian footballer who plays as a forward for Portuguese club Trofense.

Career statistics

Club

References

External links

1996 births
Footballers from Rio de Janeiro (city)
Living people
Brazilian footballers
Association football forwards
Botafogo de Futebol e Regatas players
Santa Cruz Futebol Clube players
Boavista Sport Club players
Sport Club Atibaia players
Atlético Cajazeirense de Desportos players
Cianorte Futebol Clube players
C.D. Trofense players
Campeonato Brasileiro Série A players
Campeonato Brasileiro Série D players
Campeonato Paranaense players
Liga Portugal 2 players
Brazilian expatriate footballers
Expatriate footballers in Portugal
Brazilian expatriate sportspeople in Portugal